Wulian Road is a station on Line 6 of the Shanghai Metro. It began operation on December 29, 2007. It is located near the junction of Wulian Road and Zhangyang Road (North), in Shanghai's Pudong New Area.

The station provides access to the neighbouring Wenfeng Plaza via a footbridge. .

References 

Railway stations in Shanghai
Shanghai Metro stations in Pudong
Line 6, Shanghai Metro
Railway stations in China opened in 2007